Mia Abdullah Wazed is a Bangladesh Nationalist Party politician and the former Member of Parliament of Brahmanbaria-4.

Career
Wazed was elected to parliament from Brahmanbaria-4 as a Bangladesh Nationalist Party candidate in 1991.

References

Bangladesh Nationalist Party politicians
Living people
5th Jatiya Sangsad members
Year of birth missing (living people)